Springhill High School (SHS) is a secondary school in Springhill, Nova Scotia, Canada. SHS is part of the Chignecto-Central Regional Centre for Education and is the only high school in the town of Springhill.

References

External links
SHS

High schools in Nova Scotia
Schools in Cumberland County, Nova Scotia